Kallakudi is a panchayat town in Tiruchirappalli district in the Indian state of Tamil Nadu.

Kallakudi won the first prize for best town panchayat at Independence day awards 2021 by Government of Tamilnadu.

Demographics
 India census, Kallakudi (கல்லக்குடி) had a population of 11,625. Males constitute 50% of the population and females 50%. Kallakudi has an average literacy rate of 83%, higher than the national average of 59.5%: male literacy is 86%, and female literacy is 80%. In Kallakudi, 11% of the population is under 6 years of age.

References

Villages in Tiruchirappalli district